Charles Simeon Hare (1808 – 22 July 1882) was a politician in colonial South Australia.

Hare was born in London, England, and arrived in South Australia in September 1836, with Sir John Morphett, to whom he acted as private secretary, and was subsequently employed by the South Australian Company. He was a vigorous opponent of State aid to religion and transportation, and sat in the unicameral South Australian Legislative Council for West Torrens from July 1851 to June 1854, when he resigned. In January 1855 he was appointed a Commissioner for effectuating the wishes of Parliament in relation to the Adelaide and Gawler Railway Bill.

On 5 March 1857 Hare was elected to the first South Australian Legislative Assembly for Yatala, but resigned on 12 May 1858, on being appointed Superintendent of the Stockade. Hare became Manager of Railways in succession to Mr. Drake, in July 1860, but was removed from office in May 1865, in consequence of an accident to a train carrying the Governor and Ministry, for which a Commission of Inquiry held him culpable. After an experience of several years as a planter in Fiji, Hare returned to South Australia and managed a mine near Moonta. In 1875, he was an unsuccessful candidate for the Assembly, his defeat being due to his opposition to the men's demands during the great Moonta strike, in 1874. Hare represented the district of Wallaroo from 5 April 1878 to 10 April 1881, when he resigned and revisited England, returning to South Australia in the following year. Hare died on 22 July 1882 in Adelaide, South Australia, survived by his wife; he was buried in the West Terrace Cemetery.

References

 

1808 births
1882 deaths
Members of the South Australian House of Assembly
Members of the South Australian Legislative Council
People from London
English emigrants to Australia
Burials at West Terrace Cemetery
19th-century Australian politicians